Majid Latifi (born 21 March 1981) is an Iranian former professional futsal player.

Honours

Country 
 AFC Futsal Championship
 Champion (2): 2007 - 2008
 Asian Indoor Games
 Champion (2): 2005 - 2007
 WAFF Futsal Championship
 Champion (2): 2007 - 2012

Club 
 AFC Futsal Club Championship
 Runner-Up (1): 2011 (Shahid Mansouri)
 Iranian Futsal Super League
 Champion (2): 2010-11 (Shahid Mansouri) - 2011-12 (Shahid Mansouri)

Individual

References

 

1981 births
Living people
People from Rasht
Iranian men's futsal players
Futsal defenders
Almas Shahr Qom FSC players
Shahid Mansouri FSC players
Farsh Ara FSC players
Sportspeople from Gilan province
21st-century Iranian people